Sovico is a comune (municipality) in the Province of Monza and Brianza in the Italian region Lombardy, located about  northeast of Milan.

Sovico borders the following municipalities: Triuggio, Albiate, Macherio, Lissone.

Demographic evolution

References

External links 
 www.comune.sovico.mb.it/